Alexander "Álex" Alegría Moreno (born 10 October 1992) is a Spanish professional footballer who plays as a forward.

Club career

Betis
Born in Plasencia, Province of Cáceres, Extremadura, Alegría finished his development with CP Cacereño, and made his senior debut in the Segunda División B during the 2010–11 season. On 18 July 2012, he signed a two-year contract with Real Betis, being assigned to the reserves also in the third division.

Alegría agreed to a new deal with the Andalusians on 11 July 2014 after scoring nine goals in the 2013–14 campaign. He made his professional debut on 1 March 2015, coming on as a second half substitute for Francisco Portillo in a 0–0 away draw against CD Mirandés in the Segunda División.

On 8 July 2015, Alegría renewed his link until 2017, being immediately loaned to CD Numancia of the second tier. He appeared in his first match for the club on 23 August, playing 12 minutes and scoring a brace in the 6–3 home win over CD Tenerife.

On 15 June 2016, after 42 competitive games at the Nuevo Estadio Los Pajaritos, Alegría was definitively promoted to Betis' first team. He made his debut in La Liga on 11 September of that year, starting in a 3–2 away victory against Valencia CF.

Alegría scored his first goals in the Spanish top flight on 16 September 2016, a brace in a 2–2 home draw with Granada CF. The following 29 January, he put the hosts ahead in an eventual 1–1 draw against FC Barcelona also at the Estadio Benito Villamarín.

On 29 June 2017, Alegría was loaned to fellow top-division club Levante UD for one year. He suffered a knee injury in November, being sidelined for the remainder of the campaign.

On 31 August 2018, Alegría joined Rayo Vallecano on a one-year loan. The following 31 January, however, he moved to Sporting de Gijón also in a temporary deal.

Mallorca
On 2 July 2019, Alegría agreed to a five-year contract with RCD Mallorca as a free agent. The following 24 January, after being sparingly used, he moved to second division side Extremadura UD on loan for the remainder of the campaign.

Alegría signed with Real Zaragoza also in the second tier on 19 January 2021, on loan until the end of the season. On 18 August, he joined Burgos CF of the same league also in a temporary deal.

On 1 September 2022, Alegría moved to Primera Federación club CF Fuenlabrada on a one-year loan. His loan was terminated the following 31 January, and he left Mallorca shortly after.

Career statistics

Club

References

External links

Beticopedia profile 

1992 births
Living people
People from Plasencia
Sportspeople from the Province of Cáceres
Spanish footballers
Footballers from Extremadura
Association football forwards
La Liga players
Segunda División players
Segunda División B players
Tercera División players
Primera Federación players
CP Cacereño players
Betis Deportivo Balompié footballers
Real Betis players
CD Numancia players
Levante UD footballers
Rayo Vallecano players
Sporting de Gijón players
RCD Mallorca players
Extremadura UD footballers
Real Zaragoza players
Burgos CF footballers
CF Fuenlabrada footballers